Hemerocoetes morelandi is a duckbill fish of the genus Hemerocoetes, found only around New Zealand at depths of between .

Etymology
The specific name honours the New Zealand ichthyologist J. M. Moreland.

References

 
 
 Tony Ayling & Geoffrey Cox, Collins Guide to the Sea Fishes of New Zealand,  (William Collins Publishers Ltd, Auckland, New Zealand 1982) 

Percophidae
Endemic marine fish of New Zealand
Taxa named by Joseph S. Nelson
Fish described in 1979